Omar Faraj (pronounced ; born 9 March 2002) is a Swedish professional footballer who plays as a forward for Allsvenskan club AIK.

Club career

Early career and Brommapojkarna
Faraj was born in Stockholm to Palestinian parents, and was an AIK and IF Brommapojkarna youth graduate. He made his first team debut on 14 June 2020, starting and being sent off in a 1–0 Ettan Norra away win over IK Frej.

Faraj scored his first senior goal on 28 June 2020, netting his team's second in a 3–3 home draw against Team TG FF. He finished his first senior season with five goals, and renewed his contract until 2023 on 18 March 2021.

Faraj scored a brace in a 4–1 home routing of IFK Haninge on 2 May 2021, and also netted a hat-trick in a 6–0 thrashing of Täby FK late in the month.

Levante
On 6 August 2021, Faraj moved abroad and signed a five-year contract with La Liga side Levante UD, being initially assigned to the reserves in Segunda División RFEF. He was the B-side's top goalscorer during the season with seven goals, as the team was unable to avoid relegation.

Faraj made his first team – and La Liga – debut on 20 May 2022, coming on as a late substitute for Alejandro Cantero in a 4–2 away success over Rayo Vallecano, as the Granotes were already relegated.

On 21 July 2022, Faraj was loaned to Degerfors IF back in his home country, until December.

AIK 
On 26 October 2022, it was officially announced that Faraj would join his boyhood club AIK on a permanent deal in January 2023, signing a three-year contract in the process.

International career 
Faraj made his full international debut for Sweden on 9 January 2023, replacing Hugo Larsson 68 minutes into a friendly 2–0 win against Finland.

Career statistics

International

References

External links
 
 

2002 births
Living people
Footballers from Stockholm
Swedish footballers
Sweden international footballers
Association football forwards
Allsvenskan players
Ettan Fotboll players
IF Brommapojkarna players
Degerfors IF players
La Liga players
Segunda Federación players
Atlético Levante UD players
Levante UD footballers
Swedish expatriate footballers
Swedish expatriate sportspeople in Spain
Expatriate footballers in Spain
Swedish people of Palestinian descent